R364 road may refer to:
 R364 road (Ireland)
 R364 road (South Africa)